The men's 3000 metres steeplechase at the 2022 World Athletics Championships was held at the Hayward Field in Eugene on 15 and 18 July 2022.

Summary

From the start, the field deferred to Sebastián Martos, marked by Evan Jager, in turn marked by his teammate Hillary Bor.  After a slow 2 and a half laps, Lamecha Girma moved up to the point.  He too did not push the pace, so defending champion Conseslus Kipruto came forward.  Still nobody wanted too push, the pack was packed together at points 5 abreast across the track, waiting for the pace to increase.   As they entered the penultimate lap the pace did increase, Leonard Bett tripping and falling out the back of the pack.  Yemane Haileselassie took over the lead heading into the bell.  At the start of the final lap Getnet Wale took the lead, Hailemariyam Amare came up to join him but fell over the first barrier on the backstretch, where so many runs to victory have been launched.  After biding his time for 7 laps, world leader Soufiane El Bakkali went from third place to a two meter lead over Kipruto through the final water jump.  Kipruto couldn't accelerate with El Bakkali, Girma went around him to try to chase, but El Bakkali was gone, expanding his lead a couple more meters to the finish.  Kipruto was slowing to the finish but was able to hold off a streaking finish by Wale for bronze.

Records
Before the competition records were as follows:

Qualification standard
The standard to qualify automatically for entry was 8:22.00.

Schedule
The event schedule, in local time (UTC−7), was as follows:

Results

Heats 

The first 3 athletes in each heat (Q) and the next 6 fastest (q) qualified to the final.

Final 
The final was started on 18 July at 19:22.

References

Steeplechase
Steeplechase at the World Athletics Championships